Frank N. Costa (October 25, 1945 – March 2, 1987) was an American radio broadcaster and politician who represented the 1st Berkshire District in the Massachusetts House of Representatives from 1983 to 1987.

Early life
Costa was born on October 25, 1945 in Fall River, Massachusetts. He graduated from B.M.C. Durfee High School and went on to attend the Northeast Broadcasting School (now New England Institute of Art) in Boston.

Broadcasting career
After graduating from NBS in 1964, Costa began his career as a newscaster at WBRL in Berlin, New Hampshire. In 1966, Costa enlisted in the United States Army. He attended the Defense Information School and managed a military and civilian news department in Panama for the United States Department of Defense. In 1968, Costa joined WMNB in North Adams, Massachusetts as a news reporter and assistant to the general manager.

Political career
Costa left WMNB in 1980 when he was elected to the Adams, Massachusetts board of assessors. In 1982 he was elected to the Massachusetts House of Representatives. He was reelected in 1984 and chose not to run for reelection in 1986.

Death
On March 2, 1987, Costa was found dead of carbon monoxide asphyxiation in his garage by his wife. Prior to his apparent suicide, Costa had openly discussed his struggle with stress and mental illness.

References

1945 births
1987 deaths
American radio news anchors
Massachusetts College of Liberal Arts alumni
Democratic Party members of the Massachusetts House of Representatives
New England Institute of Art alumni
People from Adams, Massachusetts
Politicians from Fall River, Massachusetts
Suicides by carbon monoxide poisoning
Suicides in Massachusetts
American politicians who committed suicide
20th-century American politicians
1987 suicides